Nelcynda is a place in ancient Kerala. It was described in Pliny's classical work The Natural History as well as in Periplus of the Erythraean Sea. It was believed to be the capital of the Ay kingdom. Nakkada near Niranam in Pathanamthitta district are often identified with Nelcynda.

Variations
Nelcynda is mentioned by various authors under varying forms of the name. As has been already stated, it is Melkunda in Ptolemy, who places it in the country of the Ay. In the Peutingerian Table it is Nincylda, and in the Geographer of Ravenna, Nilcinna. Pliny the Elder in his book Naturalis Historia calls the port Neacyndi.

Citations

Periplus of the Erythraean Sea

According to the Periplus, numerous Greek seamen managed an intense trade with Muziris:

The Natural History
Pliny the Elder (c. 23- 77 CE) gives a description of voyages to India in the 1st century CE.  He refers to many Indian ports in his work The Natural History.

Present location
The present location is actually not self-evident. Some researchers identity Nelcynda with Nakkada near Niranam. Other possible locations include Neendakara, Nirkunnam, Kannetri
and Kollam. The details like "Nelcynda is distant from Muziris by river and sea about five hundred stadia..." and other evidences of ancient ports are used in arriving at these possibilities. Scholars have tried to identify the port of Nelcynda with Kallada on the Kallada River (Yule 1903), with Nirkunnam on the Meenachil River (Kanakasabhai 1904), with Niganda (which later on came to be known as Niranam) (I C Chacko 1979) and with Kottayam (Sastri 1955, Gurukkal and Whittakker 2001).

Kollam
Kollam (Nelcynda) shares fame with Kodungallur (Muziris) as an ancient sea port on the Malabar coast of India from early centuries of the Christian era. Kollam had a sustained commercial reputation from the days of the Phoenicians and the Romans. Pliny (23-79 AD) mentions about Greek ships anchored at Musiris and Nelkanda. Musiris is identified with Kodungallur (then ruled by the Chera kingdom) and Nelkanda (Nelcyndis) with Quilon or Kollam (then under the Pandyan rule). The inland sea port(kore-ke-ni) was also called Tyndis. Kollam was the chief port of the Pandyas on the West Coast and was connected with Korkai (Kayal) port on the East Coast and also through land route over the Western Ghats. Spices, pearls, diamonds and silk were exported to Egypt and Rome from these two ports on the South Western coast of India. Pearls and diamonds came from Ceylon and the South eastern coast of India, then known as the Pandyan kingdom. Yule identifies Nelcynda as Kallada. That would also satisfy the mention "This place also is situated on a river, about one hundred and twenty stadia from the sea...." Yule writes

Niranam
This assumption is possible from the mention "This place also is situated on a river, about one hundred and twenty stadia from the sea....". But there are no evidences of Niranam being an ancient port. Barace can be identified as Varakkai.

Kannetri
Caldwell is said to have identified it with Kannetri

Nelcynda in Fiction
 
Writer and Renowned Social Anthropologist Susan Visvanathan wrote a novella based on Nelcynda, called "Nelycinda and Other Stories", Roli Books(2012).

References

See also

 Muziris
 Ay kingdom
 Kollam
 Kollam Port

History of Kollam
History of Kerala